Mike Strofolino (born February 6, 1944) is a former American football linebacker. He played for the Baltimore Colts and Los Angeles Rams in 1965 and for the St. Louis Cardinals from 1966 to 1968.

References

1944 births
Living people
American football linebackers
Villanova Wildcats football players
Baltimore Colts players
Los Angeles Rams players
St. Louis Cardinals (football) players
Hamilton Tiger-Cats players